Szegedi Honvéd SE was a Hungarian football club from the town of Szeged.

History
Szegedi Honvéd SE debuted in the 1951 season of the Hungarian League and finished tenth. They were dissolved in 1953 and replaced in the Hungarian League by Szegedi EAC.

Names
1939–1945: Szegedi Honvédtiszthelyettes Altiszti Sportegyesület
1945–1946: Szegedi Toldi
1946: merger with Szegedi TK
1946–1949: Szegedi Honvéd TK
1949–1953: Szegedi Honvéd SE
1953: dissolved
1955: refounded
1955–1959: Szegedi Honvéd SE
1959–1972: Honvéd Kossuth Lajos SE

References

External links
 Profil

Football clubs in Hungary
Defunct football clubs in Hungary